Parapolybia is a genus of paper wasp of the Ropalidiini tribe in the sub-family Polistinae of the family Vespidae which contains five species which are found from Iran in the west to Melanesia in the east.

References

Vespidae
Hymenoptera genera